Vittorio Emanuele Propizio (born 30 December 1991) is an Italian actor in cinema and television.

Career
Propizio was born in Rome to Sicilian parents. Among his films are: My Brother is an Only Child (2007), where he played a young Accio; Grande, grosso e... Verdone, where he played the child of Carlo Verdone; Natale a Rio, starring Christian De Sica, Massimo Ghini and Ludovico Fremont. Also in 2009, he acted in the film Natale a Beverly Hills, directed by Neri Parenti, and in 2010 he played one of the protagonists of Parents and Children: Shake Well Before Using, a film by Giovanni Veronesi, and also with Veronesi he performed in The Ages of Love, where he played Cupid. In 2015 he was in the cast of Aneddoti Kids.

Filmography

Film
My Brother is an Only Child (2007)
Grande, grosso e Verdone (2008)
Natale a Rio (2008)
Natale a Beverly Hills (2009)
Limbo (2009)
Parents and Children: Shake Well Before Using (2010)
The Ages of Love (2011)
Three Days Later (2013)
Torno indietro e cambio vita (2015)
Miami Beach (2016)

Television
 I liceali (2008)
 I liceali 2 (2009)

References

External links
 Official website
 

1991 births
Italian male film actors
Italian male child actors
Italian male television actors
Living people
People of Sicilian descent